WALL-E is a 2008 American computer-animated film.

WALL-E may also refer to:

 WALL·E (character), the title character of the film
 WALL-E (soundtrack), the soundtrack to the film
 WALL-E (video game), a video game based on the film